Yancheng is a prefecture-level city in northeastern Jiangsu province, People's Republic of China. As the city with the largest jurisdictional area in Jiangsu, Yancheng borders Lianyungang to the north, Huai'an to the west, Yangzhou and Taizhou to the southwest, Nantong to the south, and the Yellow Sea to the east. Formerly a county, the current Yancheng city was founded on January 18, 1983.

Yancheng, literally "Salt City", is named after the salt harvest fields surrounding the city. According to historical records, collection and production of sea salt in the region began as early as 119 BC, during the Western Han Dynasty, when the settlement on the current location of Yancheng was named Yandu County. According to the 2010 Census, Yancheng has a registered population of 8,203,728 — with 7,260,240 permanent residents. Its built up area  of Tinghu and Yandu Districts was home to 1,615,717 inhabitants in 2010.

Administration

The prefecture-level city of Yancheng administers 9 county-level divisions, including 3 districts, 1 county-level city and 5 counties. The population information here presented uses 2010 census data of permanent residents.

History
Yancheng has a history of 2,100 years since the first canton was founded here in Han Dynasty at year 119 BC. It was named for the salt reserves in rivers around the area, its name literally meaning "Salt City". In later years, the city was the home of Fan Zhongyan, the 12th century statesman and Shi Nai'an, the reputed author of famous novels.

Yancheng was in the limelight during the Chinese Civil War from the 1930s to 1940s. The New Fourth Army led by the Communist Party of China was reestablished in Yancheng after being ambushed and battered by the enemy. After the revival, the Army played a very important role in the war and finally the foundation of the People's Republic of China. Many monuments in honor of these heroes can still be found around Yancheng.

Chenjiagang Chemical Industry Park explosions
A major fire and explosion accident happened in March 2019, killing 78 people and at least 94 were severely injured. Around 640 people required hospital treatment and were taken to 16 hospitals. The facility—located in Yancheng's industrial park—was operated by Tianjiayi Chemical (江苏天嘉宜化工有限公司), and was used to produce fertilizer or pesticides.  Tianjiayi Chemical had previously been penalized six times for infractions of pollution and waste management laws, and China Daily reported fines over safety issues. According to the South China Morning Post, this plant paid bribes, paid journalists and local officials so this chemical plant could remain open without any negative publicity or reasons to shut down.

On 27 November 2007, an explosion occurred in one of the chemical factories in Chenjiagang Chemical Zone (陈家港生态化工园区), with seven killed and around 50 injured. On 23 November 2010, more than thirty were poisoned by a toxic gas release. In the early morning of 11 February 2011, rumors of toxic chemical release and potential imminent explosions in the Chenjiagang Chemical Industry Park led over ten thousand residents to evacuate in panic from the towns of Chenjiagang and Shuanggang (双港镇) during which four people died and many were injured. On the afternoon of May 18 and again on July 26 in 2011, there were explosions at local factories.

Geography

By the end of the Mesolithic period, the marine transgressions changed almost of the area into a shallow bay. Continued deposition of silt carried by the Yangtze River and the Huai River extend its coast to the east gradually. Since 1128, the course of the Yellow River have changed to join up with the Huai River. The change has accelerated.

Climate 
Typical of northern and central Jiangsu, Yancheng has a humid subtropical climate (Köppen Cfa/Cwa), strongly influenced by the East Asian Monsoon.

Transportation

Road

Expressways 
 G15 Shenyang–Haikou Expressway
 G1515 Yancheng–Jingjiang Expressway
 G1516 Yancheng–Luoyang Expressway

National Highway 
 China National Highway 204

Railway 
Xinyi-Changxing Railway runs through the city.

Buses 
The BRT system of Yancheng uses a dedicated bus lane on a  route and as of 2010 carries 33,000 passengers per day. The first line went into service in 2010.

The Yancheng District SRT Line 1 began testing in March 2021 and officially opened for trial operation on 16 April 2021 with a 17-station,  route. The line uses the Autonomous Rail Rapid Transit system with four-segment 320 passenger guided vehicles. During the trial operation, the B3 line of Yancheng City Public Transport Company will run on the same line as the SRT.

Air 
Yancheng Nanyang International Airport now flies directly to Shanghai and Beijing, as well as flying directly to Hong Kong, Taiwan, South Korea, Japan and so on.

Economy
The economy of Yancheng City has sustained its momentum. Preliminary statistics found that in 2015 gross regional products of the city was RMB 421,250,000,000, a 10.5 percent increase by comparable price from previous year. Agriculture has increased by RMB 51,653,000,000 in value, a 3.6 percent increase from previous year; industry has increased by RMB 192,547,000,000 in value, a 10.5 percent increase from previous year; tertiary business has increased by RMB 177,050,000,000 in value, a 12.5 percent increase from previous year.

Gross regional products per capita was RMB 58,299 (or US$8,862 at the average exchange rate of 2015), a 10.4 percent increase from previous year.

Education

Universities and colleges 

 Yancheng Institute of Technology
 Yancheng Teachers University

High schools 

 Jiangsu Yancheng Wuyou Senior High School
 Jiangsu Yancheng Middle School
 Jiangsu Yancheng Jingshan Middle School
 Tinghu High School of Jiangsu Province
 Jiangsu Funing Middle School
 Jiangsu Yancheng NO.1 Middle school

Tourism 

Outdoor activities include the Yangcheng wetlands and salt marshes, home of some unique and endangered species, including Père David's deer and the red-crowned crane. There is also a famous food street in east road springing up in recent years in which there are many restaurants in the style of Huizhou architecture.

Notable people
Lu Xiufu  
Qiao Guanhua 
Hu Qiaomu
Hau Pei-tsun
Taylor Wang
Wei Yi
Luo Xiaojuan
Xu Sihai – purple tea pot expert and curator

Twin cities

Yancheng is twinned with the following domestic and foreign cities.

Domestic

Turpan, Xinjiang
Taiyuan, Shanxi
Yanbei Prefecture, Shanxi
Qinzhou, Guangxi
Wuxi, Jiangsu
Xicheng District, Beijing
Zhuhai, Guangdong
Qinhuangdao, Hebei
Jilin, Jilin
Yan'an, Shaanxi
Yangjia, Shanxi
Haikou, Hainan
Dachuan, Sichuan
Changning District, Shanghai
Lhasa, Tibet
Dandong, Liaoning
Xuhui District, Shanghai

International

 Chieti, Abruzzo, Italy (since October 1, 1992)
 Namwon, North Jeolla, South Korea (June 13, 1998)
 Deva, Romania (November 12, 1998)
 Kashima, Ibaraki, Japan (November 8, 2002)
 San Diego, California, United States (October 20, 2003)

Formal paper to be signed

Hagen, Germany
St. Petersburg, Russia
Brescia, Italy

In addition, the county-level city of Dafeng, administered by Yancheng, is also twinned with Ascoli Piceno, Italy (September 2001) and Guri, South Korea (February 20, 2003) respectively.

References

External links

 Government website of Yancheng (available in Chinese and English)
 Yancheng Local portal (in Simplified Chinese)
 Yancheng comprehensive guide with open directory (Jiangsu.NET)
 Yancheng Tourism Board (in Simplified Chinese)
 Yancheng Introduction (Yancheng Middle School) Extensive background on Yancheng history.

 
Cities in Jiangsu
Yangtze River Delta